The 2013 AFC U-16 Women's Championship qualification is the qualification stage of 2013 AFC U-16 Women's Championship. The first matches were played on 6 November 2012.

Format
There is only one qualification round. Teams are divided into four regional groups. After playing each other once the group winners and second placed teams qualify for final tournament.

If two or more teams are equal on points on completion of the group matches, the following criteria were applied to determine the rankings.
 Greater number of points obtained in the group matches between the teams concerned;
 Goal difference resulting from the group matches between the teams concerned;
 Greater number of goals scored in the group matches between the teams concerned;
 Goal difference in all the group matches;
 Greater number of goals scored in all the group matches;
 Kicks from the penalty mark if only two teams are involved and they are both on the field of play;
 Fewer score calculated according to the number of yellow and red cards received in the group matches;
 Drawing of lots.

Results

Group A
 All matches are held in Amman, Jordan (UTC+2).

† Kuwait pulled out of the AFC U16 qualifiers.

Group B
 All matches are held in Colombo, Sri Lanka (UTC+5:30).

Group C
All matches are held in Manila, Philippines (UTC+8).

Group D
 All matches are held in Guam (UTC+10).

References

External links
Official tournament website
Tournament at futbol24.com

AFC U-16 Women's Championship qualification
women
Afc
2013 in youth sport